The JE postcode area, also known as the Jersey postcode area, is a group of postal districts covering Jersey.

Coverage
The approximate coverage of each postcode district:

The post town for all addresses is JERSEY.

See also
Postcode Address File
Jersey Post
List of postcode areas in the United Kingdom
Guernsey postcode area

References

External links
Royal Mail's Postcode Address File
A quick introduction to Royal Mail's Postcode Address File (PAF)

Postcode Area JE
Postcode areas covering the Crown Dependencies